Szendehely is a village in Nógrád County, Hungary. It has a relatively high German population of 37%.

References

External links
 Street map 

Populated places in Nógrád County